Homodoxus is a genus of moths belonging to the family Tineidae. It contains only one species, Homodoxus aristula, which is found in Mexico and Guatemala.

The wingspan is 14–24 mm. The forewings are shining white, with a series of seven fuscous spots along the costa, all of which become rich metallic-peacock-green immediately below the margin. The hindwings are white, with a slight greyish ochreous tinge.

References

Tineidae
Monotypic moth genera
Moths of North America
Tineidae genera